is a passenger railway station in located in the city of Tsu,  Mie Prefecture, Japan, operated by the private railway operator Kintetsu Railway.

Lines
Momozono Station is served by the Nagoya Line, and is located 75.5 rail kilometers from the starting point of the line at Kintetsu Nagoya Station.

Station layout
The station was consists of two opposed side platforms , connected by an underground passage. The station is unattended.

Platforms

Adjacent stations

History
Momozono Station opened on May 18, 1930 as a station on the Sangu Express Electric Railway's Tsu Line.  The Tsu Line was renamed the Nagoya Line on December 7, 1938. On March 15, 1941, the Sangu Express Electric Railway merged with Osaka Electric Railway to become a station on Kansai Express Railway's Nagoya Line. This line in turn was merged with the Nankai Electric Railway on June 1, 1944 to form Kintetsu.  The station has been unattended since March 1, 2001.

Passenger statistics
In fiscal 2019, the station was used by an average of 333 passengers daily (boarding passengers only).

Surrounding area
Tsu Municipal Momozono Elementary School
Tsu Municipal Hisai Higashi Junior High School

See also
List of railway stations in Japan

References

External links

Kintetsu: Momozono Station

Railway stations in Japan opened in 1930
Railway stations in Mie Prefecture
Stations of Kintetsu Railway
Tsu, Mie